The North Carolina National Guard (NCNG), commonly known as the North Carolina guard, is a component of the North Carolina Department of Public Safety and the National Guard of the United States. It is composed of Army and Air National Guard units. The adjutant general's office is located in Raleigh.

History
The North Carolina National Guard, or Carolina militia as it was originally known, was born from the Carolina Charter of 1663. The charter gave to the Proprietors the right "to Leavy Mufter and Trayne all sortes of men of what Conditon or wherefoever borne in the said Province for the tyme being".

During the COVID-19 pandemic in North Carolina, the North Carolina National Guard was activated to assist in logistics and transportation of medical supplies, as the state reported it had 179 cases.

Mission

The Constitution of the United States specifically charges the National Guard with dual federal and state missions. Other than state defense forces and the state defense militias, the National Guard is the only United States military force empowered to function in a state status.

Those functions range from limited actions during non-emergency situations to full-scale law enforcement of martial law when local law enforcement officials can no longer maintain civil control. The National Guard may be called into federal service in response to a call by the President or Congress.

The federal mission assigned to the National Guard is: "To provide properly trained and equipped units for prompt mobilization for war, National emergency or as otherwise needed." The state mission assigned to the National Guard is: "To provide trained and disciplined forces for domestic emergencies or as otherwise provided by state law."

Command structure
The Governor may call individuals or units of the North Carolina National Guard into state service during emergencies or to assist in special situations which lend themselves to use of the National Guard. When National Guard troops are called to federal service, the President serves as Commander-in-Chief.

References

Further reading

External links

 

1663 establishments in the British Empire
National Guard
Military units and formations established in 1663
National Guard
National Guard (United States)
National Guard
National Guard
National Guard
United States Army National Guard by state